Kevin Ray Underwood (born December 19, 1979) is a convicted murderer from Purcell, Oklahoma.

Crimes
Authorities had sought a missing 10-year-old girl, Jamie Rose Bolin, for whom an Amber Alert had been issued. Underwood, who lived near Bolin in the same apartment complex, was arrested on April 17, 2006. Underwood admitted to FBI agents and Oklahoma detectives that he had murdered and attempted to decapitate Bolin, telling them, "Go ahead and arrest me. She is in there. I chopped her up." After Underwood's confession, Bolin's corpse, stashed in a large plastic container, was recovered from his bedroom closet.

Purcell Police Chief David Tompkins stated that Bolin's murder was the culmination of Underwood's fantasy to "kidnap a person, rape them, torture them, kill them, cut off their head, drain the body of blood, rape the corpse, eat the corpse then dispose of the organs and bones."

Underwood was convicted of having bludgeoned Bolin to death with a wooden cutting board. Police stated that they found meat tenderizer and barbecue skewers at the scene, which they presume were intended for use on the victim's corpse.

Trial
On February 29, 2008, a jury found him guilty of first-degree murder.  A jury recommended the death penalty on March 7, 2008.
On April 3, 2008, McClain County District Judge Candace Blalock approved the recommended death sentence. Underwood attempted to appeal his sentence because it would be an unconstitutionally cruel and unusual punishment due to his mental illness (he was initially diagnosed with schizotypal personality disorder at his trial but was later diagnosed with Asperger syndrome). An Oklahoma City federal judge rejected the appeal.

Scheduled execution
On July 1, 2022, Underwood was one of twenty-five death row inmates to be scheduled for execution in Oklahoma. He was scheduled to be executed on December 7, 2023. His execution was later postponed due to a request by attorney general Gentner Drummond, who asked for sixty days between executions rather than thirty "to alleviate the burden on DOC personnel." He is currently awaiting a new execution date.

See also
 List of death row inmates in the United States
 List of people scheduled to be executed in the United States

References

External links
 Continuing coverage on the case from The Oklahoman
 Wabnitz, Melissa A. - "Purcell girl found dead at neighbor’s apartment: Investigators have identified and arrested a man they believe is responsible for the kidnapping and murder of 10-year-old Jamie Rose Bolin." Norman Transcript April 14, 2006
 Transcript of taped confession

1979 births
2006 murders in the United States
Living people
People from Purcell, Oklahoma
American people convicted of murder
American murderers of children
American cannibals
American prisoners sentenced to death
Prisoners sentenced to death by Oklahoma
People convicted of murder by Oklahoma
People with Asperger syndrome